Mrs. Parkington is a 1944 drama film. It tells the story of a woman's life, told via flashbacks, from boarding house maid to society matron. The movie was adapted by Polly James and Robert Thoeren from the novel by Louis Bromfield. It was directed by Tay Garnett and starred Greer Garson and Walter Pidgeon appearing together as husband and wife for the fourth time.

Plot 
At Christmastime in 1938, Susie Parkington, an elderly society matron and widow of the wealthy businessman and financier Major Augustus Parkington, is visited by her many relatives, with the exception of her beloved great-granddaughter Jane.  Except for Jane, Susie's heirs are boorish, dissolute, and unhappy despite their wealth. When Jane does appear, she informs her great-grandmother that she plans to secretly elope with Ned Talbot, her father's employee, who wishes to take her away from her family and their way of life.

Susie has a flashback to her own life. As a teenager, Susie helps her mother run a boarding house for silver miners in Leaping Rock, Nevada. She meets Major Augustus Parkington, the owner of the mine, when he stays at the boardinghouse on a visit; the miners complain to him about dangerous working conditions, but he refuses to fix them as it would slow down the yield of the mine, instead paying the miners higher salaries to take the risk and telling them to quit if they are so afraid.

Shortly afterwards, a serious mine accident occurs which kills Susie's mother along with a number of miners. Rather than leave Susie to an uncertain fate, Augustus marries her and takes her away to New York City. Susie is introduced to Baroness Aspasia Conti, a French aristocrat and close friend and former mistress of Augustus, who helps Susie pick out clothes and learn the social graces needed for a woman of her station.

Back in the present, Susie arranges a meeting with Ned, where he reveals that Jane's father Amory (Susie's grandson-in-law) is being investigated for fraud, and Ned planned to take Jane away in order to avoid telling her or having to testify against Amory. Susie disapproves of Ned's handling of the situation, prompting Jane to send Ned away. Amory confesses to Susie and Jane that he did commit fraud, and begs Susie for a loan of $31 million to cover his actions in hopes of avoiding prison. Susie is inclined to give him the loan, but says he must ask the rest of the family, as Amory would be spending their inheritance.

Susie once again reminisces about her past.  She remembers how, on their third anniversary, Augustus presented her with a grand house, furnished with Aspasia's help.  Susie announces that she is pregnant, and an elated Augustus holds a ball to celebrate, inviting the wealthiest and most socially prominent citizens of New York, but his happiness turns to fury when most of them refuse to attend due to his blunt, outspoken behavior. His rage upsets Susie, and when she runs away from the dinner party, she runs upstairs, faints, falls down the stairs, and has a miscarriage.

Augustus angrily vows revenge against the non-attendees, and unbeknownst to Susie, manages to force many of them out of business over the next few years.  Susie only finds out after Mrs. Livingstone, whose husband is about to be put out of business by Augustus, pleads with Susie for help and informs her that another man committed suicide after Augustus ruined him. Susie has words with Augustus, who remains unrepentant, so she separates from him and takes up new quarters on Long Island, with frequent visits from Aspasia. Several weeks pass before Augustus begs his wife to return home, revealing that he has been unsuccessful in his mission to put the Livingstones out of business. Susie then informs him that she has been secretly financially supporting the Livingstone business and that his vendetta must stop. Augustus agrees and the couple reunite.

Back in the present, as Susie expected, her heirs refuse to lend Amory the money. Amory, overcoming his fear of going to prison, resolves to make a full confession to the authorities; Susie approves, saying that is what the Major would have done.

Once again, Susie has a flashback, this time to when her son Herbert (father of greedy granddaughters Madeleine and Helen) was killed in an accident while playing polo.  Susie becomes a recluse for a year and Augustus moves to England, renting a lavish country home and carrying on an affair with Lady Norah Ebbsworth. Aspasia convinces Susie to fight for her marriage, so Susie follows Augustus to England and, with the assistance of the Prince of Wales, convinces him to end his affair.

Following this, Aspasia reveals that she will be moving back to Paris. She also admits to Susie that she has always been in love with Augustus. Susie reveals that she has always known, and after she herself was sure of Augustus' love for her, she loved Aspasia too. Augustus and Susie have a heart-to-heart in which he hopes that if their grandchildren develop the weaknesses he associates with money that is inherited rather than earned, he or Susie will be alive to set them straight.

Once more in the present, Susie realizes she made a mistake in having Jane send Ned away, and tells Jane to follow her heart and go after Ned, which Jane gladly does. Finally, Susie makes the decision to bail out Amory anyway, as many "little people" would otherwise lose their money through his fraud. Her daughter, granddaughters, and great grandson leave in disgust after learning they will be cut off by Susie. Once they leave, Susie calls upstairs for her lady's maid to make ready for the day. She also shouts to her that after the finances are distributed, they'll be returning to Leaping Rock, Nevada.

Cast 
 Greer Garson as Susie Parkington
 Walter Pidgeon as Major Augustus Parkington
 Edward Arnold as Amory Stilham
 Agnes Moorehead as Baroness Aspasia Conti
 Cecil Kellaway as Edward VII, Prince of Wales
 Tala Birell as Lady Nora Ebbsworth
 Gladys Cooper as Alice (née Parkington), Duchess de Brancourt
 Frances Rafferty as Jane Stilham
 Tom Drake as Ned Talbot
 Dan Duryea as Jack Stilham
 Helen Freeman as Helen (née Parkington) Stilham
 Lee Patrick as Madeleine (née Parkington) Swann
Rod Cameron as Al Swann
 Peter Lawford as Lord Thornley
 Hugh Marlowe as John Marbey
 Fortunio Bonanova Signor Cellini
 Harry Cording as Humphrey 
 Hans Conried as Mr. Ernst
 Gerald Oliver Smith as Taylor 
 Gordon Richards as James
 Wallis Clark as Capt. McTavish (uncredited)
 Al Ferguson as Miner (uncredited)
 Byron Foulger as Norman Vance (uncredited)
 Howard Hickman as Dr. Herrick (uncredited)
 Brandon Hurst as Footman (uncredited)

Awards 
Garson was nominated for an Oscar for Best Actress and Agnes Moorehead for Best Supporting Actress. Moorehead also won the Golden Globe Award for Best Supporting Actress.

Box office 
According to MGM records, the film earned $3,062,000 in the US and Canada and $2,569,000 elsewhere resulting in a profit of $2,198,000.

Radio adaptation 
Mrs. Parkington was presented on Lux Radio Theatre November 25, 1946. Pidgeon and Garson reprised their roles from the film.

References

External links 
 
 
 
 

1944 films
1940s English-language films
American romantic drama films
American black-and-white films
Films directed by Tay Garnett
Films featuring a Best Supporting Actress Golden Globe-winning performance
Metro-Goldwyn-Mayer films
Films based on American novels
Films based on works by Louis Bromfield
Films scored by Bronisław Kaper
1944 romantic drama films
1940s American films